Çınar Tarhan (born 20 May 1997) is a Turkish footballer who plays as a midfielder for Düzcespor.

Career statistics

Club

Notes

References

1997 births
People from Beykoz
Footballers from Istanbul
Living people
Turkish footballers
Association football midfielders
Beşiktaş J.K. footballers
Galatasaray S.K. footballers
Kardemir Karabükspor footballers
Sarıyer S.K. footballers
Ankara Demirspor footballers
Çaykur Rizespor footballers
Süper Lig players
TFF Second League players
TFF Third League players